Cuphocarpus is an obsolete genus of flowering plants in the  family Araliaceae.  Mabberley (2008) treated it as a  synonym of Polyscias, but other  authors still recognized it at that time. In 2010, in a phylogenetic analysis of DNA sequences, it was shown that Cuphocarpus was biphyletic and embedded in the large genus Polyscias. In an accompanying  paper, Polyscias was divided into 11 subgenera, with seven species left incertae sedis.

Since Cuphocarpus is no longer an accepted genus, its species will be referred to herein by their  names in Polyscias. Polyscias aculeata is the type species for Cuphocarpus.  It is now the sole species in Polyscias subgenus Cuphocarpus. Four other species, formerly in Cuphocarpus, are now in Polyscias subgenus Maralia. All species that have ever been placed in Cuphocarpus are endemic to Madagascar.

Polyscias inermis has been recognized by some authors, but others have regarded it as conspecific with Polyscias aculeata. Polyscias aculeata (sensu lato) is  indigenous to the coastal forest of eastern Madagascar. Polyscias briquetiana, Polyscias humbertiana, Polyscias leandriana, and Polyscias compacta (= Cuphocarpus commersonii) are  montane species of the Madagascan interior. They were transferred from Cuphocarpus to Polyscias subgenus Maralia in 2010.

Recognizing six species, Frodin and Govaerts (2003) described Cuphocarpus as "shrubs or trees, closely  related to Polyscias, but fruits 1-seeded; these latter are moreover surmounted by the  persistent  calyptroid  corolla". René Viguier thought that they were sometimes  parthenocarpous.

History 
The genus Cuphocarpus was erected by Decaisne and  Planchon in 1854.  Quattrocchi writes that the  name is "from the  Greek kyphos "bent, curved, humped" and carpos "fruit"".

Decaisne and Planchon  named only one species, Cuphocarpus aculeatus (now Polyscias aculeata). Cuphocarpus inermis (now Polyscias inermis) was added by John Gilbert Baker in 1884. Hermann Harms put both of these in Polyscias in 1898, but his treatment was not followed by others.

In 1966, Luciano Bernardi  described four new species in Cuphocarpus. When these were transferred to Polyscias in 2010, Cuphocarpus commersonii was renamed as Polyscias compacta, because the name Polyscias commersonii already existed. The latter is a synonym for Polyscias paniculata, a Madagascan endemic in Polyscias subgenus Grotefendia. The four species described by Bernardi are now in Polyscias subgenus Maralia.

In 2003, Frodin and Govaerts stated that Cuphocarpus "is seen as biphyletic". It was  confirmed to be so in 2010 in a molecular phylogenetic study of  nuclear and chloroplast DNA. Polyscias aculeata (including Polyscias inermis) was resolved as  sister to Polyscias subgenus Sciadopanax, which consists of 13 species from Africa, Madagascar, and nearby islands. Polyscias aculeata was placed in its own subgenus, Polyscias subgenus Cuphocarpus. The four species described by Bernardi are now in Polyscias subgenus Maralia. This is the largest subgenus of Polyscias and will contain about 115 species, when all of the  undescribed species are  published. Nearly all of them are restricted to Madagascar.

References

External links 
 Cuphocarpus  Mabberley's Plant-Book
 Recircumscription of Polyscias by Lowry & Plunkett.2010  Hawaii Barcoding  University of Hawaii at Hilo
 Cuphocarpus  Index Nominum Genericorum  References  NMNH Department of Botany  Research and Collections  Smithsonian National Museum of Natural History
 World Checklist and Bibliography of Araliaceae  World Checklists  kewbooks  Scientific Publications  Kew Gardens
 Sur les Araliacées du groupe Polyscias, page 285  volume 52 (1905)  Bulletin de la Société Botanique de France
 Cuphocarpus   Plant Names  IPNI
 Cuphocarpus And Grotefendia And Palmervandenbroekia At: Names At: Tropicos At: Science and Conservation At: Missouri Botanical Garden
 CRC World Dictionary of Plant Names: A-C At: Botany & Plant Science At: Life Science At: CRC Press
 Cuphocarpus At: List of Genera At: Araliaceae At: List of families At: Families and Genera in GRIN  At: Queries At: GRIN taxonomy for plants
 Polyscias aculeata  subgenus Cuphocarpus  Polyscias  Araliaceae  Apiineae  Apiales In: ··· Embryophyta At: Streptophytina At: Streptophyta At: Viridiplantae At: Eukaryota At: Taxonomy At: UniProt

Araliaceae
Historically recognized angiosperm genera
Polyscias